USS Ino was a clipper ship acquired by the Union Navy during the course of the American Civil War. She was capable of great speed and distance, and was a formidable warship with powerful guns.

Ino was a clipper ship, purchased at Boston, Massachusetts, 30 August 1861 and commissioned at the Boston Navy Yard 23 September, Lt. J. P. Cressy in command. Unusual speed and large storage space suited her ideally for long-range cruising against Confederate commerce raiders.

In search of "rebel pirates"

Her first duty began 27 September when she departed Boston, Massachusetts, in search of "rebel pirates." When word came that the South's famed cruiser CSS Sumter, under the brilliant master of seamanship, Captain Raphael Semmes, was in European waters, Ino sailed from Boston 5 February 1862 and reached Cadiz, Spain, only 13 days and 16 hours later. Semmes finally abandoned Sumter there in order to get back into action. An interesting side light to this operation occurred at Tangier, Morocco 26 February when Ino took two crewmen of Sumter from a threatening mob and turned the prisoners over to the Boston-bound American merchant ship Harvest Home.

Stateside operations
 
Back in Boston, Ino was ordered to Port Royal, South Carolina, for duty in the South Atlantic Blockading Squadron 4 August 1862. On her voyage south she captured the French bark La Manche attempting to run the Charleston, South Carolina, blockade 23 August.

Searching for Semmes again
Six days later she arrived at St. George, Bermuda, to obtain from the American consul the latest information on blockade running activity in that quarter. She got underway the next day at the behest of the neutrality-conscious governor of Bermuda and made Port Royal 7 September. Only 4 days later she set sail for New York to be prepared for a cruise in search of her old adversary, Semmes, who was now attacking northern merchantmen with his new raider, . Ino departed New York 5 November and cruised in the lanes frequented by American merchantmen and whalers, arriving at St. Helena 5 January 1863. She remained in waters off St. Helena until setting course for the United States 1 March. She arrived New York 15 April for repairs.
 
Ino departed New York 29 May 1863 escorting California-bound clipper Aquilla carrying the disassembled parts of monitor Comanche.

Disguised as a merchantman in order to lure CSS Florida
 
After repairs at New York, Ino joined the North Atlantic Blockading Squadron. Disguised as a merchantman to lure  into action, she cruised in the North Atlantic Ocean 24 October when she arrived Portland, Maine.
 
Ino was transferred to the East Gulf Blockading Squadron 22 November where she served until after the end of the war. She returned to New York 1 August 1865 and remained there under repairs until 16 October when she sailed to serve in the Mediterranean and off the coast of Portugal.

Post-war decommissioning and sale
 
Ino set-course for the United States 13 December 1866 and arrived Boston 25 January 1867. She decommissioned there 13 February and was sold at public auction 19 March 1867 to Samuel G. Reed. After the sale, the ship was renamed Shooting Star (not to be confused with the Boston-built clipper of the same name).

References

External links
Passenger List, Clipper Ship Ino, Arrived San Francisco from New York, July 12, 1852
Painting of clipper ship Ino, Mystic Seaport Museum

Ships of the Union Navy
California clippers
Barques
Individual sailing vessels
Age of Sail merchant ships of the United States
Merchant ships of Finland
Ships built in New York (state)
1851 ships